Donald Sorenson (1948-1985) was a queer painter and sculptor who was born and raised in Southern California. He is known for his abstract art style that pushed the boundaries of the contemporary art scene.

Biography 
Donald (Don) Sorenson was born in Glendale, California in 1948. He was an LA-based American painter and sculptor who mainly focused on producing abstract and line-work within his art. Being born during the Baby Boom era of the 20th century, Don and other contemporary artists at the time explored the realm of experimental art. Taking his passion further he would receive his education and master's degree of fine arts at the California State University Northridge. Don would continue his art career by going to hosting his own exhibitions and partaking in others all over the United States. He would go on to have his art featured in galleries in his native Southern California region, but also in cities such as Washington D.C., Albuquerque, and New York City. Don's art grew in popularity over the years and his work began to evolve. Going from work that was only line-work, to abstract renditions of Greek Gods. As his art career progressed, Don would contract AIDS, which he would struggle with but continue publishing work until 1985, the year he passed away.

Notable art

Notable solo-exhibitions

Awards 
1980- National Endowment for the Arts grant

1984- Young Talent Award Los Angeles County Museum of Art

Bibliography 
“Estate of Don Sorenson - Artists - Robert Berman Gallery.” Robert Berman Gallery, www.robertbermangallery.com/artists/estate-of-don-sorenson?view=slider. Accessed 15 Jan. 2022.

The Estate of Don Sorenson, where his art is described in great detail. There is even an analysis of his more well-known work.

Knight, Christopher. “Christopher Knight on Don Sorenson.” Artforum International, 1 Dec. 1979, www.artforum.com/print/reviews/197910/don-sorenson-67645.

A 1979 article printed in Artforum, by Christopher Knight, on the works of Don Sorenson. Where he takes note of how Don's art style has shifted over the years.

Muchnic, Suzanne. “ART REVIEW : A REVELATION OF SORENSON AND MIGHT-HAVE-BEEN.” Los Angeles Times, 12 Mar. 2019, www.latimes.com/archives/la-xpm-1986-05-13-ca-6170-story.html.

In a Los Angeles Times article, Don Sorenson is remembered for his work and contribution to the art world, highlighting several of his pieces and notable accomplishments within his career.

External links 

 Official Website
 Robert Berman Gallery

Further reading 
Wortz, Melinda. The University of California, Irvine Fine Arts Gallery: 1985-1986 20th Anniversary. University Art Gallery, 1986.

References 

Wikipedia Student Program
1948 births
1985 deaths
California State University, Northridge alumni
People from Glendale, California
20th-century American painters